The Maba or Bargo people are a Sunni Muslim ethnic group found primarily in the mountainous of Wadai region in eastern Chad and western  Sudan . Their population is estimated to be about 300,000 in Chad. Other estimates place the total number of Bargo people in Sudan to be about 700,000.

The Bargo today primarily adhere to Islam, following the Maliki Sunni denomination. They supported the Sultans of Abeche and the Sudanic kingdoms, who spoke their language. Little is certain about their history before the 17th century. They are noted as having helped expel the Christian Tunjur dynasty and installed an Islamic dynasty in their region in the early 17th-century. Their homelands lie in the path of caravan routes that connect the Sahel and West Africa with the Middle East. The Bargo  people are an African people. They are traditionally pastoral and farmers who are clan-oriented.

The Bargo people have also been referred to as the Wadai, a derivative of Ouaddaï. They speak Maba, a Nilo-Saharan language, of the Maban branch. Locally this language is called Bura Mabang. The first ten numerals in Bargo language, states Andrew Dalby, are "tek, bar, kungal, asal, tor, settal, mindri, rya, adoi, atuk", and this is very distant from other Nilo-Saharan languages. Although an ethnic group, their Bargo language was the state language of the Islamic state of Wadai, and continued to be an important language when the Islamic Bornu Empire conquered these lands. Many Bargo people also speak Arabic, as their traditional trade language.

The Bargo people rebelled against the tribute demands of the Bornu Empire, and became sovereign people. They then led raids to southern regions for plunder and slaves from non-Muslim African ethnic groups. The African slaves of the Bargo people were absorbed in the Bargo tribal culture, and often they converted to escape slavery. In the 19th century, a powerful Bargo Sultanate on slave trading caravan route emerged under rulers such as Muhammad al-Sharif and Doud Murra. The Bargo Sultanate was abolished by the French in 1912, and the Bargo people's region thereafter annexed into the Ubangi-Shari colony. The Barg’s participated in the efforts to end the colonial rule and then in the civil wars in Chad.

The Bargo people are subdivided into many sub-clans, each controlling certain grazing lands and sources of water. Among the various sub-clans, the largest are the Marfa,’’ salihab’’,Djene and Mandaba.

See also
 Jumjum
 Sudan
 Chad
 Darfur
 South Sudan

References

Ethnic groups in Sudan
Ethnic groups in Chad